Keokuk County is a county located in the U.S. state of Iowa. As of the 2020 United States Census, the population was 10,033. The county seat is Sigourney.

History

Keokuk County was formed in 1837. It was named for the eponymous chief of the Sac Indians, who advocated peace with the white settlers. In May 1843, the county opened for public settlement, with its judicial and regulatory duties assigned to the existing Washington County. Its governing structure was created in 1844, although the seat was not decided (for Sigourney) until 1856.

Keokuk County is unusual in that it has two county fairs. The Keokuk County Fair is held in What Cheer and immediately followed by the Keokuk County Expo which is held in Sigourney.

The Keokuk County Courthouse was built in 1911, in Sigourney's Public Square Historic District. It has been listed on the National Register of Historic Places since 1981.

Geography
The South Branch of the Skunk River drains the topography, flowing eastward through the lower portion of the county.

Major highways

  Iowa Highway 1
  Iowa Highway 21
  Iowa Highway 22
  Iowa Highway 78
  Iowa Highway 92
  Iowa Highway 149

Adjacent counties

 Poweshiek County − northwest
 Iowa County − north
 Washington County − east
 Jefferson County − southeast
 Wapello County − southwest
 Mahaska County − west

Demographics

2020 census
There were 4,654 housing units, of which 4,174 were occupied.

2010 census
There were 4,931 housing units, of which 4,408 were occupied.

2000 census

As of the 2000 United States Census, there were 11,400 people, 4,586 households, and 3,155 families in the county. The population density was 20 people per square mile (8/km2). There were 5,013 housing units at an average density of 9 per square mile (3/km2). The racial makeup of the county was 99.00% White, 0.07% Black or African American, 0.11% Native American, 0.23% Asian, 0.02% Pacific Islander, 0.21% from other races, and 0.36% from two or more races. 0.54% of the population were Hispanic or Latino of any race.

There were 4,586 households, out of which 30.50% had children under the age of 18 living with them, 59.00% were married couples living together, 6.50% had a female householder with no husband present, and 31.20% were non-families. 27.80% of all households were made up of individuals, and 15.80% had someone living alone who was 65 years of age or older. The average household size was 2.45 and the average family size was 2.99.

The county population contained 25.70% under the age of 18, 7.00% from 18 to 24, 25.50% from 25 to 44, 21.60% from 45 to 64, and 20.20% who were 65 years of age or older. The median age was 40 years. For every 100 females there were 94.10 males. For every 100 females age 18 and over, there were 91.80 males.

The median income for a household in the county was $34,025, and the median income for a family was $41,818. Males had a median income of $28,306 versus $22,083 for females. The per capita income for the county was $17,120. About 7.50% of families and 10.10% of the population were below the poverty line, including 12.90% of those under age 18 and 10.50% of those age 65 or over.

Communities

Cities

 Delta
 Gibson
 Harper
 Hayesville
 Hedrick
 Keota
 Keswick
 Kinross
 Martinsburg
 North English (partial)
 Ollie
 Richland
 Sigourney
 South English
 Thornburg
 Webster
 What Cheer

Unincorporated communities
 Atwood
 Coal Creek
 Pekin (partial)
 Talleyrand

Townships

 Adams
 Benton
 Clear Creek
 East Lancaster
 English River
 Jackson
 Lafayette
 Liberty
 Plank
 Prairie
 Richland
 Sigourney
 Steady Run
 Van Buren
 Warren
 Washington
 West Lancaster

Population ranking
The population ranking of the following table is based on the 2020 census of Keokuk County.

† county seat

Politics
For most of its history, Keokuk County has backed Republican Party candidates in presidential elections, with Democratic Party candidates only winning the county in eight presidential elections from 1896 on. Bill Clinton is the most recent Democratic presidential candidate to win the county (1996), while in 2016 his wife, Hillary Clinton, had the worst performance by a Democrat since 1924, only winning 26.9 percent of the vote. 2016 Republican candidate Donald Trump made a significant gain compared to his party's 2012 candidate Mitt Romney.

Education
School districts include:
 Eddyville-Blakesburg-Fremont Community School District
 English Valleys Community School District
 Keota Community School District
 Pekin Community School District
 Sigourney Community School District
 Tri-County Community School District

Former school districts:
 Eddyville–Blakesburg Community School District
 Fremont Community School District
 Hedrick Community School District

See also

 National Register of Historic Places listings in Keokuk County, Iowa
 Keokuk County Courthouse

References

External links

Keokuk County government's website

 
Iowa placenames of Native American origin
1843 establishments in Iowa Territory
Populated places established in 1843